Kalimi Lemulu is a 1962 Telugu-language drama film directed by Gutta Ramineedu. It stars Akkineni Nageswara Rao and Krishna Kumari, with music composed by Aswattama. It was produced by P. Gangadhar Rao.

Plot
Ramayya (Gummadi) a potter, leads a happy family life with his wife Manikyamba (G. Varalakshmi), a child, and younger brother Raju (Akkineni Nageswara Rao). Once Ramayya gives security to his brother-in-law Subbayya (C.S.R) for the loan he has taken from Shavukar Narasayya (Dhulipala) a devious & materialistic person. Meanwhile, Raju loves Vimala (Krishna Kumari), the daughter of Subbayya, and the elders fix their alliance. After that, Raju leaves for the city for higher studies. On the other side, Subbayya opens an oil business and earns well when Narasayya also joins him. Here evil-minded Narasayya exploits Subbayya and makes him treacherous toward Ramayya by which he loses his property. At the same time, Raju returns and gives moral support to his brother and they start a cottage industry. But Narayya again intrigues, claiming that his debt is not yet cleared and handovers cottage industry which leads to Ramayya's death. Later, Subbayya moves with the marriage proposal of Raju & Vimala, on the condition that Raju has to stay along with them to which Manikyamba agrees but Raju refuses. Parallelly, Narasayya makes his son Raja Shekharam (Prabhakar Reddy) the factory manager, who treats workers as slaves. So, fed-up workers leave the factory. Raju gathers them and starts a new industry with the support of Govt. Now Subbayya decides to make Vimala's marriage with Raja Shekaram. During that time, Narasayya ploys to destroy Raju's factory which Vimala overhears, and immediately rushes to Manikyamba, and all of them reach the factory. At last, they protect the factory, the baddies are punished and Subbayya also realizes his mistake. Finally, the movie ends on a happy note with the marriage of Raju & Vimala.

Cast
Akkineni Nageswara Rao as Raju
Krishna Kumari as Vimala 
Gummadi as Ramayya
C.S.R as Subbayya
Dhulipala as Narasayya
Mikkilineni 
Ramana Reddy as Devayya
Prabhakar Reddy as Raja Sekharam
Padmanabham 
Balakrishna
G. Varalakshmi as Manikyamba
Surabhi Balasaraswathi

Music 

Music was composed by Aswattama. Lyrics were written by Malladi Ramakrishna Sastry. Music was released on Audio Company.

References

1960s Telugu-language films
Indian drama films